A Single Woman is the final studio album by the singer Nina Simone, released in 1993 via Elektra Records.

Critical reception
The Times wrote: "Despite the strings, the woodwinds, the French accordions or the 'My Way' overtones of many of these songs, [Simone] speaks with bleak honesty and unashamed recalcitrance to many people who value such qualities above sham professionalism or artifice."

Reviewing a reissue, Clash wrote that Simone's "voice is richer and deeper; her phrasing resembles more than ever the tender voicing of a jazz trumpet."

Track listing

Personnel
 Nina Simone – vocals, piano
 John Chiodini, Al Schackman – guitar
 John Clayton, Buell Neidlinger, Christopher Hanulik, David Young, Jim Hughart, John Peña, Margaret Storer, Steve Edelman, Susan Ranney – bass
 Mike Melvoin – piano
 Jeff Hamilton, Paul Robinson, Andre Fischer – drums
 Bill Summers, Larry Bunker, Darryl Munyungo Jackson – percussion
 Gerald Albright – tenor saxophone
 Jack Sheldon – trumpet
 Frank Marocco – accordion
 Ann Stockton, Carol Robbins – harp
 Assa Drori, Connie Kupka, Gina Kronstadt, Gordon Marron, Henry Ferber, Irving Geller, Isabelle Daskoff, Israel Baker, Jay Rosen, Joel Derouin, Kathleen Lenski, Mari Tsumura, Mark Cargill, Shari Zippert, Yvette Devereaux – violin
 Evan Wilson, Herschel Wise, Margot MacLaine, Marilyn Baker, Rollice Dale – viola
 David Speltz, Frederick Seykora, Igor Horoshevsky, Marie Fera, Melissa Hasin, Suzie Katayama – cello
 Bob Tricarico, Earl Dumler, Gary Foster, Jack Nimitz, Jeff Clayton, Jon Kip, Valerie King – woodwind, reeds
 Brad Warnaar, Jeff DeRosa, Marilyn Johnson, Richard Todd – French horn
 Gerald Vinci – concertmaster, violin
 Jeremy Lubbock, John Clayton, Richard Evans, Nina Simone, Andre Fischer – arrangements

Technical
 Andre Fischer – Producer
 Al Schmitt – mixing, recording
 Michael Alago – executive producer
 Carol Friedman – photography

Charts

References 

1993 albums
Nina Simone albums
Elektra Records albums